The masculine beauty ideal is a set of cultural beauty standards for men which change based on the historical era and the geographic region. These standards are ingrained in men from a young age to increase their perceived physical attractiveness.

Masculine beauty ideals are mainly rooted in heteronormative beliefs about hypermasculinity, but they heavily influence men of all sexual orientations and gender identities. The masculine beauty ideal traits include but are not limited to: male body shape, height, skin tones, body weight, muscle mass, and genital size. Men oftentimes feel social pressure to conform to these standards in order to feel desirable, and thus elect to alter their bodies through processes such as extreme dieting, genital enlargement, radical fitness regimens, skin whitening, tanning, and other bodily surgical modifications.

Because masculine beauty standards are subjective, they change significantly based on location. A professor of anthropology at the University of Edinburgh, Alexander Edmonds, states that in Western Europe and other colonial societies (Australia, and North and South America), the legacies of slavery and colonialism have resulted in images of beautiful men being "very white." Standards of beauty, however, vary based on culture and location. While Western beauty standards emphasize muscled physiques, this is not the case everywhere. In South Korea and other parts of East Asia, the rise of androgynous K-Pop bands have led to slim boyish bodies, vibrant hair, and make-up being more sought after ideals of masculine beauty.

See also 
 Feminine beauty ideal

References

External links 

Male beauty
 
Interpersonal attraction
Human sexuality
Seduction
Social constructionism
Body image in popular culture